The Photinini are a large tribe of fireflies in the subfamily Lampyrinae. Photinus pyralis is famous in biotechnology for its luciferase gene. This is sometimes employed as a marker gene; genetically modified organisms which contain it start to glow like the firefly when brought in contact with a luciferin-containing medium. Firefly luciferases differ slightly between taxa, resulting in differently colored light and other properties, and in most cases where "firefly luciferase" is used in some application or study, it is the specific luciferase of P. pyralis.

Systematics
The group has recently been examined using molecular phylogenetics, using fairly comprehensive sampling.

Genera

 Ankonophallus Zaragoza-Caballero & Navarrete-Heredia, 2014
 Aorphallus Zaragoza-Caballero & Gutierrez-Carranza, 2018
 Callopisma Motschulsky, 1853
 Calotrechelum Pic, 1930
 Dadophora Olivier, 1907
 Dilychnia Motschulsky, 1853
 Ellychnia LeConte, 1851
 Erythrolychnia Motschulsky, 1853
 Heterophotinus Olivier, 1894
 Jamphotus Barber, 1941
 Lucidina Gorham, 1883
 Lucidota Laporte, 1833
 Lucidotopsis McDermott, 1960
 Luciuranus Silveira, Khattar & Mermudes, 2016
 Macrolampis Motschulsky, 1853
 Microdiphot Barber, 1941
 Mimophotinus Pic, 1935
 Oliviereus Pic, 1930
 Phosphaenopterus Schaufuss, 1870
 Phosphaenus Fourcroy, 1785
 Photinoides McDermott, 1963
 Photinus Laporte, 1833 – rover fireflies (possibly paraphyletic)
 Platylampis Motschulsky, 1853
 Pseudolychnuris Motschulsky, 1853
 Pyropyga Motschulsky, 1852
 Pyropygodes Zaragoza-Caballero, 2000
 Robopus Motschulsky, 1853
 Rufolychnia Kazantsev, 2006
 Uanauna Campello-Gonçalves, Souto, Mermudes & Silviera, 2019
 Ybytyramoan Silveira & Mermudes, 2014

References

Lampyridae
Beetle tribes